Saint-Jean-de-Verges (Languedocien: Sent Joan de Verges) is a commune in the Ariège department in southwestern France. Saint-Jean-de-Verges station has rail connections to Toulouse, Foix and Latour-de-Carol.

Population
Inhabitants of Saint-Jean-de-Verges are called Saint-Jeantains.

Notable people 

 Logan Delaurier-Chaubet, footballer

See also
Communes of the Ariège department

References

Communes of Ariège (department)
Ariège communes articles needing translation from French Wikipedia